The Government Victoria General Hospital, generally called Gosha Hospital, is the first women and children's hospital in the Visakhapatnam city which has served more than a century. It is located at Chengal Rao Peta, Visakhapatnam.

History
King Goday Narayana Gajapathi Rao bought land for this hospital in 1894. In the early days, this hospital was run by Hilda Mary Lazarus with the permission of establishing the hospital from Queen Victoria. The hospital name was changed to Victoria Hospital in 1949. This hospital was comes under government of Madras.

Services
This hospital serves women and children. The current capacity of this hospital is 200 beds and the Government of Andhra Pradesh expanding it with 100 more beds.

References

Hospital buildings completed in 1894
 Hospitals in Visakhapatnam
Children's hospitals in India
1894 establishments in India